Grzegorz Śledziewski (born 18 July 1950) is a Polish sprint canoeist who competed from the early 1970s to the early 1980s. He won fifteen medals at the ICF Canoe Sprint World Championships with three golds (K-1 1000 m: 1971, 1975 (tied with Italy's Oreste Perri); K-2 500 m: 1974), five silvers (K-1 500 m: 1970, 1977; K-1 1000 m: 1973, 1974; K-4 1000 m: 1979), and seven bronzes (K-1 500 m: 1973, 1974, 1975; K-1 1000 m: 1970, K-1 4 x 500 m: 1974, K-4 500 m: 1978, 1979).

Śledziewski also competed in three Summer Olympics, earning his best finish of fourth in the K-4 1000 m event at Moscow in 1980.

References

1950 births
Canoeists at the 1972 Summer Olympics
Canoeists at the 1976 Summer Olympics
Canoeists at the 1980 Summer Olympics
Living people
Olympic canoeists of Poland
Polish male canoeists
Sportspeople from Gdańsk
ICF Canoe Sprint World Championships medalists in kayak